The 2019 Chicago elections took place in two rounds on February 26, 2019, and April 2, 2019. Elections were held for Mayor of Chicago, City Clerk of Chicago, City Treasurer of Chicago, and all 50 members of the Chicago City Council. The candidates who won in these elections were inaugurated on May 20, 2019. Four ballot referendums were also voted on in certain precincts. The elections were administered by the Chicago Board of Elections.

Mayor

Incumbent mayor Rahm Emanuel announced on September 4, 2018, that he would not run for re-election, reversing his previous announcement that he would run. Fourteen candidates appeared on the ballot in the first round election on February 26, 2019. Since no candidates won 50% of the vote, the top two vote-getters advanced to a run-off election. These candidates were former President of the Chicago Police Board Lori Lightfoot and Cook County Board President Toni Preckwinkle. In the general election on April 2, 2019, Lightfoot defeated Preckwinkle, winning with 73.7% of the vote.

Candidates

Candidates who advanced to runoff
The following candidates advanced to the runoff election on April 2
Lori Lightfoot, Former President of the Chicago Police Board (2015–2018), Chair of the Chicago Police Accountability Task Force
 Toni Preckwinkle, President of the Cook County Board of Commissioners since 2010, former Alderman from the 4th Ward (1991–2010)

Candidates eliminated in the first round
The following candidates were eliminated in the first round and did not advance to the runoff election
 Gery Chico, Chair of the Illinois State Board of Education (2011–2015), President of the Chicago Park District Board of Commissioners (2007–2010)
 Bill Daley, White House Chief of Staff (2011–2012), United States Secretary of Commerce (1997–2000)
 Amara Enyia, Director of the Austin Chamber of Commerce
 Bob Fioretti, Former Alderman from the 2nd Ward (2007–2015)
 La Shawn Ford, Member of the Illinois House of Representatives since 2007
 John Kozlar, Candidate for Alderman from the 11th Ward in 2011 and 2015
 Garry McCarthy, Former Superintendent of the Chicago Police Department (2011–2015)
Susana Mendoza, Illinois Comptroller since 2016, City Clerk of Chicago (2011–2016), Member of the Illinois House of Representatives (2001–2011)
 Neal Sáles-Griffin, CEO of CodeNow
 Paul Vallas, Former Chief Executive Officer of Chicago Public Schools (1995–2001)
 Willie Wilson, BusinessmanOwner of Omar Medical Supplies

Write-in candidates
A full list of eligible write-ins was made available to precincts on election day.
 Rebecca Ayers
 Catherine Brown D’Tycoon, activist
 Ja’Mal Green, executive director of the Majostee Allstars Community Center and Black Lives Matter activist
 Daniel Fein
 Ryan Friedman
 Stephen Hodge
 John P. Loftus
 Richard Benedict Mayers, perennial candidate and alleged white supremacist, write-in candidate for Chicago City Clerk, Treasurer, and alderman in 2019; congressional candidate in 2000, 2002, 2008, 2016, and 2018; 1998 State House candidate; 1993 Berwyn city clerk and city treasurer candidate
 Tamara McCullough AKA Tamar Manasseh
 Robert A. Palmer
 Ziff A. Sistiunk
 Eric “Kubi” James Stewart
 Romaine Ware 
 Roger L. Washington, police officer, educator at Malcolm X College, pastor, candidate for alderman in Chicago's 24th ward in 2015
 Gregory Young

Petitions rejected
The following candidates had been denied inclusion on the ballot following successful challenges to their petitions:
Conrien Hykes Clark, octogenarian elementary school volunteer
 Dorothy A. Brown Cook, Clerk of the Circuit Court of Cook County since 2000
 Catherine Brown D'Tycoon, activist subsequently ran as write-in
 Sandra L. Mallory, former local school council president, former Chicago Public Schools security officer, candidate for alderman in Chicago's 15th ward in 2003 and 2015
 Richard Mayers, perennial candidate and alleged white supremacist, congressional candidate in 2000, 2002, 2008, 2016, and 2018; 1998 State House candidate; 1993 Berwyn city clerk and city treasurer candidate subsequently ran as write-in
 Roger L. Washington, police officer, educator at Malcolm X College, pastor, candidate for alderman in Chicago's 24th ward in 2015 subsequently ran as write-in

Withdrew
The following individuals are previously-declared candidates who had terminated their candidacies. Unless otherwise indicated, these individuals did not submit petitions:
 Rahm Emanuel, incumbent Mayor of Chicago
 Ja'Mal Green (had submitted petition), executive director of the Majostee Allstars Community Center and Black Lives Matter activist subsequently ran as write-in 
 William J. Kelly, radio host and perennial candidate, candidate for mayor in 2015, gubernatorial candidate in 2018, candidate for state comptroller in 2010, congressional candidate in 1994
 Troy LaRaviere, president of the Chicago Principals and Administrators Association
Matthew Rooney
William "Dock" Walls, perennial candidate, candidate for mayor in 2007, 2011, 2015

Declined
The following are prospective and speculative candidates that declined to run:

 Chance the Rapper, rapper, singer-songwriter, record producer
 Richard Boykin, former member of the Cook County Board of Commissioners
 Anthony Beale, Alderman from the 9th ward
 Walter Burnett Jr., Alderman from the 27th ward
 Tom Dart, Cook County Sheriff
 Arne Duncan, former U.S. Secretary of Education and former CEO of Chicago Public Schools
 Bridget Gainer, member of the Cook County Board of Commissioners
 Chuy García, Congressman from Illinois's 4th congressional district, former member of the Cook County Board of Commissioners and candidate for mayor in 2015
 Luis Gutierrez, former Congressman from Illinois's 4th congressional district
 Valerie Jarrett, former director of the White House Office of Public Engagement and Intergovernmental Affairs
 Ra Joy, executive director of CHANGE Illinois and candidate for lieutenant governor in 2018;
 Raymond Lopez, alderman of the 15th Ward
 Lisa Madigan, former Attorney General of Illinois
 Proco Joe Moreno, member of the Chicago City Council from the 1st ward
 David Orr, former Cook County Clerk, former mayor of Chicago 1987–1987;
 Ricardo Muñoz, member of the Chicago City Council from the 22nd ward
 Maria Pappas, Cook County Treasurer
 Ameya Pawar, member of the Chicago City Council, and candidate for governor in 2018
 Mike Quigley, Congressman from Illinois's 5th congressional district
 Pat Quinn, candidate for Illinois Attorney General in 2018, former Governor of Illinois, former Lieutenant Governor of Illinois and former Treasurer of Illinois
 Carlos Ramirez-Rosa, Alderman for the 35th Ward (running for reelection)
 Kwame Raoul, Attorney General of Illinois, former member of the Illinois Senate 
 Larry Rogers Jr., commissioner of the Cook County Board Of Review
 Michael Sacks, chief executive officer of GCM Grosvenor
 Roderick Sawyer, member of the Chicago City Council and chair of the Chicago City Council Black Caucus
 Kurt Summers, City Treasurer of Chicago
Pat Tomasulo, sportscaster, comedian
 Tom Tunney, member of the Chicago City Council from the 44th ward
 Anna M. Valencia, Chicago City Clerk
 Scott Waguespack, member of the Chicago City Council and chairman of the council's Progressive Reform Caucus
 Jesse White, Secretary of State of Illinois and former state representative

Results

City Clerk

Incumbent City Clerk Anna M. Valencia ran unopposed on the ballot after two potential challengers were removed for the ballot due to a lack of sufficient nominating petition signatures. Valencia thus won in the first round election on February 26, 2019.

Valencia had been first appointed in 2017 following the resignation of Susana Mendoza (who had resigned in order to assume the office of Illinois Comptroller).

Candidates

On ballot
Anna M. Valencia, incumbent City Clerk

Write-in
 Richard Benedict Mayers, perennial candidate and alleged white supremacist, write-in candidate for Chicago mayor, Treasurer, and alderman in 2019, congressional candidate in 2000, 2002, 2008, 2016, and 2018; 1998 State House candidate; 1993 Berwyn city clerk and city treasurer candidate
 William "Dock" Walls, perennial candidate, candidate for mayor in 2007, 2011, 2015, 2019

Petitions rejected
The following candidates had been denied inclusion on the ballot following successful challenges to their petitions
Elizabeth Arias-Ibarra
Patricia Horton, former Metropolitan Water Reclamation District of Greater Chicago Commissioner, candidate for 3rd Ward Chicago alderman in 2015, candidate for 3rd district Cook County Commissioner in 2018

Endorsements

Results

City Treasurer 

Incumbent City Treasurer Kurt Summers announced that he would not run for re-election on October 16, 2018. Three candidates appeared on the first round ballot on February 26, 2019: Illinois state representative Melissa Conyears-Ervin, Chicago alderman Ameya Pawar, and accountant Peter Gariepy. Conyears-Ervin and Pawar advanced to the run-off election on April 2, where Conyears-Ervin won with 59.4% of the vote.

Candidates

On ballot
 Melissa Conyears-Ervin, member of the Illinois House of Representatives from the 10th district since 2017
 Peter Gariepy, candidate for Cook County Treasurer in 2018
 Ameya Pawar, 47th ward Chicago alderman

Write-in
 Richard Benedict Mayers, perennial candidate and alleged white supremacist, write-in candidate for Chicago mayor, City Clerk, and alderman in 2019, congressional candidate in 2000, 2002, 2008, 2016, and 2018; 1998 State House candidate; 1993 Berwyn city clerk and city treasurer candidate

Endorsements

First round

Runoff

Polls

Runoff

First round

Results

City Council 

Of the 50 wards represented in Chicago City Council, 45 incumbent aldermen ran for re-election, of whom 38 were re-elected. In the first round election on February 26, 2019, four new aldermen were elected, including three who defeated incumbents. Elections in fourteen wards advanced to run-off elections on April 2, when eight new aldermen were elected. A total of 12 new aldermen were elected.

Ballot measures 
Four referendums appeared on the ballot in certain precincts on February 26, 2019:

 Rent Control Referendum
 Obama Center Referendum
 Marijuana Tax Revenue Allocation Referendum
 El Paseo Trail Referendum

See also 

 2019 United States elections

External links 

 City elections in Chicago, Illinois in 2019 on Ballotpedia

References 

Chicago elections
Municipal elections in Chicago
February 2019 events in the United States
April 2019 events in the United States
Lori Lightfoot